Switzerland competed at the 2014 Winter Paralympics in Sochi, Russia, held between 7–16 March 2014.

Medalists

Alpine skiing

Men

See also
 Switzerland at the Paralympics
 Switzerland at the 2014 Winter Olympics

References

Nations at the 2014 Winter Paralympics
2014
Winter Paralympics